The Suicide Club is a 2000 American-Irish film based on the story The Suicide Club by Robert Louis Stevenson. It was directed by Rachel Samuels.

It was from Concorde Anois and was shot in Ireland.

Cast
Jonathan Pryce
David Morrissey
Paul Bettany

Production
Filming began in April 1999 in Limerick. The budget was reportedly IR£1.6 million. Most of Corman's films of the 1990s went straight to video but he wanted this one released theatrically.

A mansion in Galway was built for the film especially. Corman intended to use this to film a remake of The Hound of the Baskervilles but it was never made.

References

External links
The Suicide Club at BFI
The Suicide Club at IMDb

2000 films
Irish drama films
2000s English-language films